Reader Rabbit Playtime for Baby is an educational video game, part of the Reader Rabbit series, developed by Mattel Interactive and published by The Learning Company in 1999. The game was designed for children aged 9 to 24 months as a software called "Lapware". The game also comes with an extra CD containing songs.

Plot
Mat the Mouse comes to visit Reader Rabbit at his house. During a game of hide and seek, Mat ducks into a toy chest where Reader can't find her and decides to play around with the games inside.

Gameplay
The game consists of ten activities:

 Hide & Seek Animals
 Faces and Feelings
 Peek-a-Boo Bubbles
 Kaleidoscope Symphony
 Musical Drawers
 My Storybook
 Shape Slide
 Rhyme Time
 Discovery House
 Mat Says

The program also incorporates the use of a microphone and a printer. No computer skills are required to play and there are no right or wrong answers in the activities. Pressing any key on the keyboard or any mouse movement and clicking always gives a response.

Development

Research
Mattel Interactive manager, Toby Levenson did extensive research in infant development and learning by observing child and parental interaction. To ensure the program was appropriate, every action made by mouse caused something to happen on screen as well the implementation of large pictures, visible motions, catchy music and bright colors.

Educational Goals
The game was designed to allow infants to interact with a computer without too much work, piquing their curiosity and stimulating them all the while forming a bond with parents. Implemented in the game were the elements of creativity, visual patterning and basic computer skills. Potentially the game could promote a baby's speech, language, growth, emotional development, social development and physical development.

References

External links
 

Children's educational video games
The Learning Company games
1999 video games
Reader Rabbit
Video games about children
Video games about mice and rats
Video games developed in the United States
Windows games
Classic Mac OS games
Single-player video games